Zbigniew Żedzicki (born 28 June 1945 in Alfeld) is a Polish former wrestler who competed in the 1968 Summer Olympics, in the 1972 Summer Olympics, and in the 1976 Summer Olympics.

References

External links
 

1948 births
Living people
Olympic wrestlers of Poland
Wrestlers at the 1968 Summer Olympics
Wrestlers at the 1972 Summer Olympics
Wrestlers at the 1976 Summer Olympics
Polish male sport wrestlers
People from Hildesheim (district)